Senkoniai (formerly ) is a village in Kėdainiai district municipality, in Kaunas County, in central Lithuania. According to the 2011 census, the village was uninhabited. It is located 2 km from Miegėnai, by the Nykis river. There are old burial ground and the Nykis elm tree (nature monument) in Senkoniai village.

Demography

Images

References

Villages in Kaunas County
Kėdainiai District Municipality